Elijah Blue Allman (born July 10, 1976), known professionally as P. Exeter Blue (Phillips Exeter Blue), is an American musician, and the son of singer Cher and her second husband, Gregg Allman; he is the half-brother  of Chaz Bono, Delilah Allman, Michael Allman, Layla Allman, and Devon Allman.  He is the lead vocalist, guitarist and lyricist of the industrial metal band Deadsy.

Career
Allman is the singer and guitarist for the rock band Deadsy, which, prior to its hiatus in April 2007, consisted of Alec Püre on drums, Dr. Nner on synthesizer, Carlton Megalodon on Ztar, and Jens Funke on bass. Deadsy released two albums: 2002's Commencement, and Phantasmagore, which came out on August 22, 2006. Many of the themes used by Allman in Deadsy have been heavily influenced by the 1955 film This Island Earth.

He was given his first guitar by Kiss bassist Gene Simmons, and at the age of 13 went on tour as a guitarist with Cher; he appears as a guitarist in the music video for her song "If I Could Turn Back Time". In 1994, he auditioned for the spot of guitarist for Nine Inch Nails, but ended up losing the spot to Robin Finck.

He has worked with Thirty Seconds to Mars for the band's self-titled debut album. and has also provided guest vocals on a variety of songs for other bands including Orgy, Coal Chamber and Sugar Ray.

Personal life
Allman attended the Hyde School in Bath, Maine, graduating in 1994.

Allman has dated Bijou Phillips, Heather Graham, Kate Hudson, and Paris Hilton.

Through his mother Cher, Allman is of Armenian, Irish, English, and German ancestry.

On December 1, 2013, he married Marieangela King, "Queenie", an English singer, of the band KING and sister of Jazzy and Ruby King from the British pop duo Blonde Electra. The couple broke up on April 20, 2020, and Allman filed for divorce the following year.

In 2014, Allman admitted that he began taking drugs at the age of 11 and battled heroin addiction for years, but claimed being sober since 2008.

Discography
With Deadsy
 Demo (1995)
 Deadsy (1996)
 Commencement (1999, unreleased version)
 Commencement (2002)
 Phantasmagore (2006)
 Subterfugue (TBA)
With Elijah Blue and the Trapezoids

Since starting Elijah Blue and the Trapezoids, Allman has released a few demos on his Myspace, but no news of an album have surfaced since 2008.
 "Haunted" 
 "White Knuckle Angel Face" 
 "Long Way Down" 

As featured musician
 Orgy – Candyass (1998, additional vocals and keyboards on "Revival")
 with Cher – Crimson & Clover (1999)
 Sugar Ray – 14:59 (1999, additional vocals on "Personal Space Invader")
 Coal Chamber – Chamber Music (1999, additional vocals and keyboards on "Shock the Monkey", additional vocals on "My Mercy")
 Orgy – Vapor Transmission (2000, additional vocals on "The Spectrum")
 "What's Going On" (2001, additional vocals on "What's Going On (Fred Durst's Reality Check Mix)")
 The Family Values Tour 2001 (2001, appears live on the Static-X song "Push It")
 Thirty Seconds to Mars – 30 Seconds to Mars (2002, plays guitar and bass on "Welcome to the Universe")
 Korn – Korn Kovers (2005, additional vocals on "Love My Way")
 Mickey Avalon – Loaded (2012, additional vocals on "Mickey's Girl", recorded in 2009)

References

Works cited

External links
 Elijah Blue Artwork at Kantor Gallery

1976 births
Living people
American expatriates in Germany
American heavy metal singers
American rock guitarists
American male guitarists
Place of birth missing (living people)
Nu metal singers
Singers from Los Angeles
Guitarists from Los Angeles
Deadsy members
American people of Armenian descent
21st-century American male singers
21st-century American singers
Allman family